The Dell Axim family of personal digital assistants was Dell's line of Windows Mobile-powered Pocket PC Devices. The first model, the Axim X5, was introduced in 2002, while the final model, the Axim X51, was discontinued on April 9, 2007.

Background

X5 family
Dell entered the personal digital assistant (PDA) market in 2002 with the debut of the Axim X5. The base-level Axim X5 had a 300 MHz Intel XScale PXA250 processor, 32 MB RAM, 32 MB flash ROM, a Type II CompactFlash slot, an SD/MMC slot, a 16-bit QVGA (240 × 320 dots) TFT display, a speaker, a microphone, and a base price of US$279. A high-end Axim X5 came with a 400 MHz Intel XScale processor, 64 MB RAM, and 48 MB flash ROM for US$349. Early models shipped with Pocket PC 2002, but an upgrade to Windows Mobile 2003 was offered and came preinstalled on some refurbished units. Despite rumours and speculations, further versions of Windows Mobile are unsupported. However, efforts have been made to port Linux to the system. Although the Axim X5 was regarded as an affordable Windows Mobile device at the time it was released, affordability came with a size penalty: The weight was 195 g (6.9 ounces) and the size was 127 × 81 × 18 mm (5 × 3.2 × 0.7 inches). The Axim X5 came with a rechargeable battery that would last for about 8 hours.

The Dell Axim X5 was superseded by the Dell Axim X3 and subsequently X30, a follow-up to the Dell Axim X5 boasting a more compact design and with lighter weight.

Many Dell Axim x5 units have issues with the touchscreen failing and a realignment failing as well, even after a hard reset. There is a design flaw inside the unit that causes this.  The inside portion of the home button will rub against the touchscreen ribbon cable and eventually wear through the protective coating and ground out the touchscreen.  The fix is to take the unit apart and put a very small piece of electrical tape over that portion of the ribbon cable.  This requires removing both batteries, clearing all data from the device (similar to a hard reset) and delicate work in taking the unit completely apart.

X3 family
Dell Axim X3 was launched in October 2003, and came in three models: the Basic, Advanced and X3i which was the same as the Advanced model but added WiFi 802.11b wireless networking. All featured replaceable battery, an SD slot, fast processor and transflective liquid crystal display. Unlike the X5, the X3 didn't have a CF slot.

All three models looked the same with the exception of the X3i which had a WiFi antenna nub on the top right corner. The Basic and Advanced models varied in processor speed and amount of memory. All models had Intel XScale PXA263 processors and Intel StrataFlash ROM.

The Basic had a 300 MHz XScale processor, 31 MB of RAM and 32 MB of ROM. The Basic model came with a USB sync cable (users could purchase a cradle separately). SD slot, WiFi capability and Infrared port included.

The Advanced model had a 400 MHz XScale processor, 64 MB of RAM and 64 MB of ROM. The Axim X3i added WiFi to the Advanced model configuration. The Advanced and X3i came with a chrome finish weighted USB sync cradle that can also charge a spare battery. In all other respects, these units were identical to each other.

X3 came with a user replaceable 950 mAh Lithium Ion battery, which could be replaced by an optional 1800 mA extended battery which doubled run times.

X30 family

The Dell Axim X30 was the first Dell Pocket PC to include Windows Mobile 2003 Second Edition on all models . This was also the first Pocket PC to include the Intel XScale PXA270 Processors. 

The High-End X30 includes a 624 MHz processor making it the fastest Personal Digital Assistant or PDA at the time it was made. The mid-level model includes everything the High-End X30 does with the exception of the cradle, and uses a 312 MHz PXA270 Processor instead.  Both the high-end and mid-level models had built-in 802.11b Wi-Fi Certification, Bluetooth 1.1 compliance, 64MB of Intel StrataFlash ROM, and 64MB RAM, while the entry-level model had 32MB SDRAM, 32MB of Intel StrataFlash ROM and no wireless capabilities.  All X30 models include a standard SD/MMC/SDIO slot, replaceable/rechargeable battery, a 3.5" QVGA TFT 16-Bit color display, and Windows Mobile 2003 Second Edition.

SDHC Cards will not function. Only SD cards of 4GB or less will work.

X50 family

The Dell Axim X50 family was available in three models. The X50 low-end model used an Intel XScale processor at 416 MHz, 64 MB flash ROM, and retailed for $299 USD. The mid-range model had 128 MB of flash ROM, a 520 MHz processor, and was listed at $399. The high-end device, the X50v, had a VGA screen, 624 MHz processor, 128 MB flash ROM, and retailed for $499 at the time of release. In 2005 the Dell Axim X50 series received a Red Dot Design Award as a recognition for its design.

The Axim X50 family is a set of Pocket PCs from Dell released in 2004 . They are available in three models. Two named X50 (referred to as Low and Mid) and the high-end X50v. In 2005 X50 series received Red Dot Design Award as a recognition for its design.

X50v
The X50v retailed for $499 at the time of release.
The v represented its VGA screen. The X50v remains one of the few devices to utilize the  Intel 2700G 3D accelerator & video decoder with 16 MB video RAM. It allowed the device to render the 3D games included by Dell as well as others available retail.
The device's memory has a built-in 128MB Intel StrataFlash ROM with 64MB RAM. The X50v shipped with Windows Mobile 2003 Second Edition. An upgrade was offered by Dell the next year to Windows Mobile 5, however it was later withdrawn because users complained about slow performance. The reason for the slowdown was that Windows Mobile 2003 stores modified files in RAM and only writes to the flash chip when users copy files to the internal storage partition. Windows Mobile 5 changes this, it does not store files in RAM and writes everything permanently to flash memory. Because of this data is not lost when the battery is empty for a long time and the RAM contents are cleared. The storage chip in the Dell Axim X50 family however is not suitable for constant writes since it is slow NOR flash, which is why Windows Mobile 5 runs slow on these devices. The X51 family in comparison has a faster flash chip and is suited to run Windows Mobile 5.

While the X50 family has reached EOL, in mid-2007, an unofficial Windows Mobile 6 ROM for the X50v appeared.  This update requires the PDA to be upgraded to WM5 and then uses the bootloader to flash a WM6 ROM image from an SD card.  The update works successfully and adds new features to the X50v.

Features include:
3.5" Quarter-VGA LCD screen with 16-Bit Color and Portrait/Landscape Support
Built-In CompactFlash expansion slot
Built-In Secure Digital expansion slot
Intel PXA270 Processor running at 416 MHz (Low)/ 520 MHz (Mid)
Available Built-In 802.11b Wi-Fi Certification (X50 Mid only)
Standard Built-In Bluetooth 1.2 Compliance
64MB (Low)/ 128MB (Mid) Intel StrataFlash ROM with 64MB on-handheld RAM
Windows Mobile 2003 Second Edition (Upgradeable to Windows Mobile 5.0 and Windows Mobile 6.0 with downloaded ROM Update)

The X50(Low) retailed for $299 USD and the X50(Mid)  retailed for $399 at launch

Firmware
The latest official Windows Mobile 2003 SE ROM build for the Axim is A05 (Released 8/18/05) and is located at Support.Dell.com

The latest official Windows Mobile 5 ROM build for the Axim is A02 (Released 12/27/06) and is located at
 Support.Dell.com

There is also an unofficial Windows Mobile 6 ROM that has been modified to run on the Axim X50v.  The current revision is A03 Beta (Released 5/11/07)

There is also an unofficial Windows Mobile 6.1 ROM for Axim x50v. The current revision is A09 LennySh edition.

X51 family
The Dell Axim X51, released late September 2005, featured the same sleek design as the X50v, but replaced Windows Mobile 2003 Second Edition with Windows Mobile 5.  The X51 also came with a larger ROM than the X50.

Like the X50, the X51 family came in three models. The X51 featured:
3.7" VGA LCD screen with 16-Bit Color and Portrait/Landscape Support (X51v only)
3.7" VGA is around 2.22" x 2.96" = around 216 pixels per inch
3.5" Quarter-VGA LCD screen with 16-Bit Color and Portrait/Landscape Support (X51 Low & Mid)
Intel 2700G 3D multimedia accelerator with 16MB video RAM (X51v only)
VGA-Out functionality (using an optional adapter cable), enabling the PDA to be connected to a monitor (X51v only)
Built-In CompactFlash Type II expansion slot
Built-In Secure Digital expansion slot
Available Built-In 802.11b Wi-Fi Certification (X51 Mid & X51v only)
Standard Built-In Bluetooth 1.2 Compliance
Long-range IrDA interface
Up to 256MB Intel StrataFlash ROM with 64MB on-board RAM
Microsoft Windows Mobile 5.0 software with Windows Media Player 10 Mobile (Upgradeable to Windows Mobile 6.1 with a downloaded ROM update)
RS-232 port is also included, but only supplies TTL signal level. Dell has a RS-232 cable for it though, even if it was never listed in their webshop.

The low-end X51 has an Intel XScale processor running at 416 MHz, 128MB flash ROM, and had a list price of $299 (before being discontinued). The mid-range model also has 128MB flash ROM, a 520 MHz processor, and retailed for $299 (from dell.com or £245.58 on www.dell.co.uk). The high-end X51v has a VGA screen, a 624 MHz processor, 256MB flash ROM, and had a list price of $379.

As of February 17, 2007 the low-end X51 has been discontinued and is not sold by Dell anymore.

There is also an unofficial upgrade to Windows Mobile 6.1 for the X51v.  Despite its unofficial status, it has been tested and had gone through several prerelease versions before being released to the general public. 
An unofficial upgrade to Windows Mobile 6.0 exists for the X50. Known bugs include the lack of support for CompactFlash cards.

There is or was also an attempt to design a Linux implementation (based on Kernel version 2.6) for the X50 and X51 families of Axims, but it is still in a very early stage with major hardware components and functions (such as the backlight, sound, PCMCIA/Compact Flash, Flash Memory, Wi-fi, Bluetooth and USB connectivity) inoperative.

There is a partially functional port of Google's Android operation system to the Axim x51 under the AxDroid project.  The current version of the build supports the Android Froyo release.

Specifications

See also
Dell, Inc.
Pocket PC
Microsoft Windows Mobile
Android

References

External links

Dell PDA Buying Guides for the United Kingdom

Dell shuns Axim X5 and X3 users  
Dell Axim X50v as per Tom's Hardware
Dell Axim X30 as per Tom's Hardware
Dell Axim PDA on Porter Electronics (Website where they are still available)

Windows Mobile Classic devices
Axim